Converge may refer to:

 Converge (band), American hardcore punk band
 Converge (Baptist denomination), American national evangelical Baptist body 
 Limit (mathematics)
 Converge ICT, internet service provider in the Philippines
CONVERGE CFD software, created by Convergent Science

See also 
 Comverge, a company that provides software, hardware, and services to electric utilities
 Convergence (disambiguation)
 Convergent (disambiguation)